Alexandra (Alex) Z. Worden is a microbial ecologist and genome scientist known for her expertise in the ecology and evolution of ocean microbes and their influence on global biogeochemical cycles.

Research Contributions
Worden's research focuses on the physiology and ecology of eukaryotic phytoplankton and their roles in the carbon cycle. She initiated this research through an NSF Postdoctoral Fellowship in Microbial Biology and expanded it thereafter by adapting multiple molecular and omic methods to characterize the evolution and ecological contributions of these photosynthetic plankton, which are now known to be major ocean primary producers. At Scripps Institution of Oceanography, a different research pursuit on microbial interactions, while in the laboratory of Farooq Azam, led to her work that overturned the idea that Vibrio cholerae existed primarily attached to copepods in aquatic systems. This was considered important for understanding the ecology of this human pathogen and vectors for transmission of infective cells. During this period she and Azam introduced the concept of Ecosystems Biology (also spelled Eco-systems Biology, EcoSystems Biology or (Eco)-systems Biology), coining the term in a 2004 perspective. The concept was embraced by the scientific community in several later perspectives, and is being pursued by human microbiome-biologist Jeroen Raes and microbial oceanographer Edward DeLong. A Jacques Monod conference on Marine Eco-Systems Biology was initiated in 2015.

Worden is also known for pioneering "targeted metagenomics" wherein cells of particular interest are separated from the masses using flow cytometry (on a ship) and genomes are then sequenced from only the cells of greatest interest. Using this approach Worden and collaborators at the DOE Joint Genome Institute sequenced partial genomes from a key group of uncultured eukaryotic algae whilst showing the distribution of these photosynthetic protists in the ocean. Most recently, her lab adapted these approaches to study uncultured unicellular predators in the ocean, and discovered giant viruses that infect Choanoflagellates, a widespread predator group related to animals. Remarkably, the viruses bring to the non-photosynthetic, predatory host complete bacteriorhodopsin-like photosystems that pump protons.

Her laboratory also investigates ancestral components of land plants, evolutionary biology and distributions of uncultured taxa and interactions between viruses and phytoplankton host cells. In 2015, she and co-authors called for a "rethinking of the marine carbon cycle". Worden publishes in the fields of environmental microbiology, evolutionary biology, genome science and oceanography.

Career
Worden started her laboratory in 2004 as Assistant Professor at the Rosenstiel School of Marine and Atmospheric Science in Miami, Florida USA. In 2007 she was recruited to the Monterey Bay Aquarium Research Institute on the U.S. West Coast while it was under the leadership of Marcia McNutt, who now serves as president of the US National Academy of Sciences. While at MBARI Worden also moved through the ranks to Full Professor Adjunct at the University of California, Santa Cruz (UCSC), and remains Adjunct at UCSC and at the Marine Biological Laboratory. She is now Professor and Unit Director at the GEOMAR Helmholtz Centre for Ocean Research Kiel and University of Kiel in Germany.

Worden's early awards came from NASA Earth Systems Science Graduate Fellowship and University of Georgia Regents Award as a graduate student. In 2000 she received a US National Science Foundation Microbial Biology Postdoctoral Fellowship in support of her groundbreaking research on picoeukaryotes. Upon founding her lab in 2004 she was awarded a Young Investigator Award. 

In 2009 Worden was named a scholar of the Canadian Institute for Advanced Research (CIFAR), later becoming a senior fellow of CIFAR (2011). She was selected from an international pool of leading scientists as a Gordon and Betty Moore Foundation Marine Investigator in 2013, an award given for her "creativity, innovation, and potential to make major, new breakthroughs". In 2015 and 2016 Worden was a Fellow in Marine and Climate Science at the HWK in Germany. She was elected as a Fellow of the American Academy of Microbiology, the honorific leadership group of the American Society for Microbiology in 2016. In 2021 she was appointed a Max Planck Fellow at the Max Planck Institute for Evolutionary Biology in Plön and named a Fellow of the Radcliffe Institute for Advanced Study at Harvard University. In 2022 she was elected to the German National Academy of Sciences Leopoldina. 

Worden is a proponent of STEM education and innovation and has highlighted the need for relevant "...role models to inspire greater diversity and creativity" in science.

Education
Worden attended Wellesley College where she received a B.A. in history and performed a concentration in Earth, Atmospheric and Planetary Sciences coursework at the Massachusetts Institute of Technology. While at the Massachusetts Institute of Technology she worked in the laboratories of the marine geochemist and paleoceanographer John M. Edmond, the climate scientist Reginald Newell, and the biological oceanographer Sallie W. Chisholm. She received a Ph.D. in Ecology from the Odum School of Ecology at the University of Georgia in Athens, GA, USA in 2000. 

Her early exposure to engineering came through computer programming at BBN Technologies before attending university and with the Massachusetts Institute of Technology solar electric car project. At the time, the award winning MIT Solar Electric Vehicle Team included several individuals who then became leading innovators in the tech world, including Gill Pratt and Megan Smith, and the team was founded by Worden's brother, James Worden.

Family
Worden has a partner and two children.

See also
 Carbon cycle
 Global warming
 Prasinophyceae
 Picoeukaryote

References

External links
Worden Unit Website
Worden at Max Planck Institute for Evolutionary Biology

American microbiologists
Science teachers
Living people
1970 births
Women microbiologists
21st-century American women scientists
University of California, Santa Cruz faculty
Wellesley College alumni
University of Georgia alumni
American oceanographers